Georgios Kourtzidis (born 11 November 1929) was a Greek footballer. He played in eight matches for the Greece national football team from 1954 to 1956. He was also part of Greece's team for their qualification matches for the 1954 FIFA World Cup.

References

External links
 

1929 births
Possibly living people
Greek footballers
Greece international footballers
Place of birth missing (living people)
Association footballers not categorized by position